Fort Hamilton is a historic fort in Brooklyn, New York, US.

Fort Hamilton may also refer to:

Bermuda
 Fort Hamilton, Bermuda, a British Army fort in the British Overseas Territory of Bermuda.

Canada
 Fort Whoop-Up, a historic fort near Lethbridge, Alberta; originally named Fort Hamilton.

United States
 Fort Hamilton High School, a high school in Brooklyn, New York
 Fort Hamilton Historic District, Newport, Rhode Island
 Fort Hamilton (Wisconsin), a frontier fort constructed in present-day Wiota, Wisconsin 
 Fort Hamilton, in Hamilton, Ohio

References